Sunil Kumar Singh (died 22 July 2020) was an Indian politician. He was a member of Rashtriya Janata Dal and a Member of Legislative Council in Bihar Legislative Council.

In July 2020, Singh died from COVID-19.

References 

20th-century births
2020 deaths
Members of the Bihar Legislative Council
Rashtriya Janata Dal politicians
Year of birth missing
Deaths from the COVID-19 pandemic in India